The Ring is a 2002 American psychological supernatural horror film directed by Gore Verbinski from a screenplay by Ehren Kruger, and starring Naomi Watts, Martin Henderson, Brian Cox, David Dorfman and Daveigh Chase. It is a remake of Hideo Nakata's 1998 film Ring, based on Koji Suzuki's 1991 novel of the same name. The plot centers on Rachel Keller, a journalist who must figure out a way to escape death after watching a cursed videotape that seemingly kills the viewer seven days after viewing it.

The Ring was released theatrically by DreamWorks Pictures on October 18, 2002, and received mostly positive reviews, with critics praising the atmosphere and visuals, Bojan Bazelli's cinematography, Verbinski's direction and Watts' performance. The Ring was a box-office success, grossing $249 million on a production budget of $48 million, making it one of the highest-grossing horror remakes of all time.

The film is the first installment of the American Ring series, and is followed by The Ring Two (2005) and Rings (2017). The success of The Ring paved the way for American remakes of several other Asian and Japanese horror films, including The Grudge (2004) and Dark Water (2005).

Plot 
Teenage girls Katie and Becca discuss an urban legend about a cursed videotape that causes whoever watches it to perish in seven days. Katie confesses to Becca that she watched such a tape with her friends the previous weekend. That night, Katie is killed by an unseen force.

At Katie's funeral, Katie's mother Ruth asks her sister Rachel, a Seattle-based journalist, to investigate her daughter's death. Rachel discovers that Katie's friends were killed in bizarre accidents on the night of her death. She also learns that Becca has been institutionalized after witnessing Katie's death. Rachel goes to the Shelter Mountain Inn, the mountain retreat where Katie and her friends watched the tape. She rents the same room, cabin 12, and watches the tape; it contains strange and frightening imagery. After the tape ends, she receives a phone call from an unknown caller who whispers, "seven days".

Rachel recruits the help of her video analyst ex-boyfriend Noah. He watches the tape and Rachel makes him a copy so they can both investigate where it came from. Rachel begins to see images from the tape appear in the real world. She discovers hidden imagery of a lighthouse and identifies a woman on the tape: a horse breeder, Anna Morgan, who killed herself after some of her horses drowned themselves off Moesko Island. Rachel finds her son Aidan, who is also Noah's son, watching the tape.

Leaving Aidan in Ruth's care, Rachel heads for Moesko Island to speak to Anna's widower Richard, while Noah travels to Eola Psychiatric Hospital to view Anna's medical files. On the ferry to the island, a horse is spooked by Rachel and leaps to its death. On the island, she discovers Anna had an adopted girl, Samara, but Richard claims it is not true. Rachel speaks to the island physician, who explains that Anna adopted Samara due to her infertility. Samara possessed the ability to psychically etch images onto objects and into peoples minds, tormenting her parents and their horses. Noah finds a psychiatric file on Samara which mentions a missing video record last seen by Richard.

Returning to the Morgan home, Rachel finds the missing video, watching it to discover Samara explaining her powers during a therapy session. Discovering Rachel, Richard strikes her and then electrocutes himself to his death in the bath, insisting that Samara is evil, and that Rachel's actions have put them all in danger. Noah arrives and he and Rachel enter the barn. In a loft converted to a bedroom to isolate Samara from the outside world, they find an image of a tree behind the wallpaper; Rachel recognizes it as a tree at the Shelter Mountain Inn.

Rachel returns with Noah to cabin 12 at Shelter Mountain Inn, where they are led to a well beneath the floorboards. They remove the lid and Rachel is pushed inside. A hand grabs her, and Rachel experiences a vision of Anna suffocating Samara, and dumping her into the well. It is then seen that Samara had actually survived this suffocation, and is now trapped and alone at the bottom of the well, finally dying over the course of seven days. Samara's body surfaces from the water. After Rachel is rescued from the well, they arrange a proper burial for Samara. Noah tells Rachel that they are now safe as more than seven days have passed since she watched the tape.

Aidan then warns Rachel that it was a mistake to try to help Samara. Rachel realizes that Noah's seven days are up and rushes to save him, but the vengeful ghost of Samara materializes on his television screen, crawls out of it and kills him. Rachel finds his disfigured face and returns home to destroy the tape. Unable to deduce why she was spared, she realizes that the tape seen by Noah and Aidan was a copy she'd created. Rachel has Aidan make a copy of the copy to show to someone else, saving him from Samara.

Cast

Production

Development and casting 
The Ring went into production without a completed script. Ehren Kruger wrote three drafts of the screenplay before Scott Frank came on to do an uncredited re-write. Gore Verbinski was initially inspired to do a remake of Ring after Walter F. Parkes sent him a VHS copy of the Japanese film, which he described as "intriguing", "pulp" and "avant-garde".
The original WGA-approved credits listed Hiroshi Takahashi (writer of the original 1998 screenplay for Ring) but his name is absent from the final print.

Several high-profile actresses were offered the lead role, including Gwyneth Paltrow, Jennifer Connelly and Kate Beckinsale. Verbinski admitted to not wanting to cast "big stars" as he wanted his film to be "discovered" and describes the wave of harsh criticism from hardcore fans of the original Japanese film as "inevitable", although he expressed desire for them to find the remake equally compelling. He also sought to retain the minimalism prevalent throughout Ring and set it in Seattle, due to its "wet and isolated" atmosphere.

Filming 

The Ring was filmed in 2001, primarily in the State of Washington in numerous locations, including Seattle, Port Townsend, Whidbey Island, Bellingham, Monroe and Stanwood. The Yaquina Head Lighthouse in Newport, Oregon, was also used as a filming location, as well as Oregon's Columbia River Gorge.

Chris Cooper played a murderer in two scenes meant to bookend the film, but was ultimately cut.

Title 
As with the original Japanese film Ring, the title of The Ring can be interpreted as referring to the telephone call which warns those who watched the cursed tape that they will die in seven days, as well as to the view of the ring of light seen from the bottom of the well where Samara was left to die.

Score 
The film features an original score composed by Hans Zimmer (who would later collaborate on Verbinski's other works). The soundtrack release did not coincide with the film's original 2002 theatrical run. It was released in 2005, accompanying The Rings 2005 sequel in an album that combined music from both the first and second film. The soundtrack contains a few themes associated with the characters, moods and locations, including multiple uses of the Dies irae theme. The score makes use of string instruments, pianos and synthesizers.

Release and reception

Marketing 
To advertise The Ring, many promotional websites were formed featuring characters and places in the film. The video from the cursed videotape was played in late-night programming over the summer of 2002 without any reference to the film. Physical VHS copies were also randomly distributed outside of movie theaters by placing the tapes on the windshields of people's cars.

Box-office 
The Ring opened theatrically on October 18, 2002 in the United States, on 1,981 screens, and grossed $15,015,393 during its opening weekend. The film went on to become a sleeper hit, leading DreamWorks to expand its release to 700 additional theaters. It ultimately grossed $129,128,133 in the United States. In Japan, the film earned $8.3 million in the first two weeks of its release. Worldwide, The Ring grossed a total of $249,348,933.

Critical response 
On the review aggregator website Rotten Tomatoes, the film has an approval rating of 71% based on 207 reviews, with an average rating of 6.60/10. The site's critics consensus reads: "With little gore and a lot of creepy visuals, The Ring gets under your skin, thanks to director Gore Verbinski's haunting sense of atmosphere and an impassioned performance from Naomi Watts". Metacritic assigned the film a weighted average score of 57 out of 100, based on 36 critics, indicating "mixed or average reviews". Audiences polled by CinemaScore gave The Ring an average grade of "B−" on an A+ to F scale.

On Ebert & Roeper, Richard Roeper gave the film "Thumbs Up" and said it was very gripping and scary despite some minor unanswered questions. Roger Ebert gave the film "Thumbs Down" and felt it was boring and "borderline ridiculous"; he also disliked the extended, detailed ending. Jeremy Conrad from IGN praised The Ring for its atmospheric set up and cinematography, and said that "there are disturbing images ... but the film doesn't really rely on gore to deliver the scares". Film Threats Jim Agnew called it dark, disturbing and original.

Despite the praise given to the direction, some criticized the lack of character development. Jonathan Rosenbaum from the Chicago Reader said that the film was "an utter waste of Watts ... perhaps because the script didn't bother to give her a character", whereas William Arnold from the Seattle Post-Intelligencer disagreed, claiming that she projects intelligence, determination and resourcefulness in the film. Several critics, like Miami Heralds Rene Rodriguez and USA Todays Claudia Puig, found themselves confused and thought "for all the time [the film] spends explaining, it still doesn't make much sense".

Accolades

Legacy 
The success of The Ring paved the way for American remakes of several other Asian and Japanese horror films, including The Grudge (2004), Dark Water (2005), Shutter and The Eye (both 2008).

The Ring ranked number 20 on the cable channel Bravo's list of The 100 Scariest Movie Moments. Bloody Disgusting ranked it sixth in their list of the "Top 20 Horror Films of the Decade", with the article saying that "The Ring was not only the first American 'J-horror' remake out of the gate; it also still stands as the best".

Sequels 
A sequel, titled The Ring Two, was released on March 18, 2005. A short film, titled Rings, was also released in 2005, and is set between The Ring and The Ring Two. A third installment, also titled Rings, was released on February 13, 2017.

See also 
 Chain letter
 List of ghost films
 List of Ring characters

References

External links 

 
 
 
 

2002 films
The Ring (franchise)
2002 horror films
2000s ghost films
2000s serial killer films
American ghost films
American horror thriller films
American mystery films
American remakes of Japanese films
American serial killer films
American supernatural horror films
Asian-American horror films
DreamWorks Pictures films
Filicide in fiction
Films about curses
Films about death
Films about families
Films about journalists
Films about television
Films based on adaptations
Films based on horror novels
Films based on Japanese novels
Films directed by Gore Verbinski
Films produced by Walter F. Parkes
Films scored by Hans Zimmer
Films set in 1978
Films set in 2002
Films set in Seattle
Films set in Washington (state)
Films set on fictional islands
Films shot in California
Films shot in Oregon
Films shot in Washington (state)
Films shot in Seattle
Films with screenplays by Ehren Kruger
Horror film remakes
Films about mother–son relationships
Supernatural drama films
Techno-horror films
2000s English-language films
2000s American films
2000s Japanese films